Dream 13 was a mixed martial arts event held by Fighting and Entertainment Group's mixed martial arts promotion Dream. The event took place on Monday, March 22, 2010 at the Yokohama Arena in Yokohama, Japan. The event aired live in North America on HDNet.

Background
This event marked the beginning of co-promotion between DREAM and US organization Strikeforce. The event would also mark the return of K. J. Noons to Mixed Martial Arts in his first fight since 2008.

While not officially announced, Tim Sylvia was planning on participating in this event. However, Dream officials allegedly tried to change his opponent roughly two weeks before the bout was planned to take place.

Marius Žaromskis was in discussions to defend his Dream Welterweight Championship against Kiyoshi Tamura at this event, but would instead appear at Dream 15 on May 30, 2010.

Results

Notes
KJ Noons and Andre Amade both weighed in at more than the 70 kg Lightweight limit and agreed to fight at 72 kg.

References

See also
 Dream (mixed martial arts)
 List of Dream champions
 2010 in DREAM

Dream (mixed martial arts) events
2010 in mixed martial arts
Sport in Yokohama
Mixed martial arts in Japan
2010 in Japanese sport